Nikola Lepojević (born 20 August 1982) is a Serbian professional basketball player for Universitet Yugra Surgut.

Professional career 
A shooting guard and point guard, Lepojević played for Sloga, OKK Beograd, Crvena zvezda, AEL Larissas, Khimik, Poplak Świecie, Universitet Yugra Surgut, Apollon Limassol, Politekhnika-Halychyna, Ural Yekaterinburg, and Hamyari Shahrdari Zanjan.

National team career 
Lepojević was a member of the Yugoslavia B-national team at the 2001 Mediterranean Games in Tunis, Tunisia.

Career achievements
 Russian Basketball Super League 1 champion: 2  (with Ural Yekaterinburg: 2011–12; with Universitet Yugra Surgut: 2016–17)

References

External links
 
 Nikola Lepojevic at eurobasket.com
 Nikola Lepojevic at aba-liga.com
 Nikola Lepojevic at proballers.com
 Nikola Lepojevic at euroleague.net
 Nikola Lepojevic at realgm.com

1982 births
Living people
ABA League players
A.E.L. 1964 B.C. players
Apollon Limassol BC players
Basketball League of Serbia players
BC Khimik players
BC Politekhnika-Halychyna players
BC Ural Yekaterinburg players
Competitors at the 2001 Mediterranean Games
KK Crvena zvezda players
KK Sloga players
OKK Beograd players
Point guards
Serbian expatriate basketball people in Cyprus
Serbian expatriate basketball people in Greece
Serbian expatriate basketball people in Iran
Serbian expatriate basketball people in Ukraine
Serbian expatriate basketball people in Poland
Serbian expatriate basketball people in Russia
Serbian men's basketball players
Shooting guards
Sportspeople from Kraljevo